The 2016 Israeli Beach Soccer League was a national beach soccer league that took place between 17 June and 29 July 2016, in Netanya, Israel.

Group stage
All kickoff times are of local time in Netanya, Israel (UTC+02:00).

Group A

Group B

Relegation playoffs (Loser on Final is relegated)

Relegation playoffs

Knockout stage

Quarter-finals

Semi-finals

Youth Final

Survival match

Final

Goalscorers

14 goals
 S. Gormezano (Bnei Yehuda "Nitzan")

13 goals
 Dino (Bnei "Falfala" Kfar Qassem)

12 goals
 A. Malca (Maccabi "Ido Keren" Haifa)

9 goals
 T. Ilos (Hapoel Ironi Petah Tikva)

8 goals
 S. Chiky ("Schwartz Home" Rosh HaAyin)

7 goals

 A. Yatim (Bnei "Falfala" Kfar Qassem)
 N. Sarsur (Bnei "Falfala" Kfar Qassem)
 V. Ganon ("Schwartz Home" Rosh HaAyin)
 S. Edri (Ilmazer "Yirmiyahu" Holon)
 A. Maher ("COFFEE4U" Kfar Saba)

6 goals

 Dieginio ("Schwartz Home" Rosh HaAyin)
 A. Levi (Maccabi "RE/MAX" Netanya)
 M. Garrido (Maccabi "RE/MAX" Netanya)
 E. Tzabari (Maccabi "RE/MAX" Netanya)
 Anderzinho (Bnei Yehuda "Nitzan")
 M. Ben Lulu (Hani "Nicoletti" Tel Aviv)
 K. Badash (Hapoel Karmiel)
 Y. Benisho (Hapoel Karmiel)

5 goals

 D. da Silva (Bnei "Falfala" Kfar Qassem)
 W. Agbaria ("Schwartz Home" Rosh HaAyin)
 A. Danin (Maccabi "RE/MAX" Netanya)
 A. Halifa (Bnei Yehuda "Nitzan")
 M. Kirtava (Hapoel "Energy Park" Hedera)
 H. Meri (Hapoel "Energy Park" Hedera)
 E. Salami (Beitar "iTrader" Jerusalem)

4 goals

 A. Sarsur (Bnei "Falfala" Kfar Qassem)
 O. Pahima ("Schwartz Home" Rosh HaAyin)
 I. Bar David ("Schwartz Home" Rosh HaAyin)
 E. Magol (Bnei Yehuda "Nitzan")
 A. Santos (Bnei Yehuda "Nitzan")
 G. Eini (Hapoel "Energy Park" Hedera)
 D. Halevi (Hani "Nicoletti" Tel Aviv)
 O. Halevi (Hani "Nicoletti" Tel Aviv)
 N. Sapir (Hapoel Karmiel)
 I. Tal (Maccabi "Ido Keren" Haifa)
 O. Halwani (Ilmazer "Yirmiyahu" Holon)
 S. Hayat (Ilmazer "Yirmiyahu" Holon)
 S. Kophman (Ilmazer "Yirmiyahu" Holon)
 Y. Sabag (Ilmazer "Yirmiyahu" Holon)
 N. Mehani ("COFFEE4U" Kfar Saba)

3 goals

 A. da Silva (Bnei "Falfala" Kfar Qassem)
 B. Briga (Maccabi "RE/MAX" Netanya)
 R. Amran (Maccabi "RE/MAX" Netanya)
 E. Elobra (Hapoel Ironi Petah Tikva)
 G. Itzhak (Hani "Nicoletti" Tel Aviv)
 Y. Shina (Hapoel Karmiel)
 E. Cohen (Maccabi "Ido Keren" Haifa)
 N. Revivo (Maccabi "Ido Keren" Haifa)

2 goals

 A. Amer (Bnei "Falfala" Kfar Qassem)
 K. Frij (Bnei "Falfala" Kfar Qassem)
 E. Sasportas ("Schwartz Home" Rosh HaAyin)
 C. Torres (Maccabi "RE/MAX" Netanya)
 Fran (Maccabi "RE/MAX" Netanya)
 R. Peretz (Bnei Yehuda "Nitzan")
 D. Maradona (Hapoel Ironi Petah Tikva)
 Heverton (Hapoel Ironi Petah Tikva)
 T. Shulkowsky (Hapoel Ironi Petah Tikva)
 O. Ilos (Hapoel Ironi Petah Tikva)
 A. Ventura (Hapoel Ironi Petah Tikva)
 O. Boaron (Hapoel Ironi Petah Tikva)
 B. Uzan (Hani "Nicoletti" Tel Aviv)
 D. Reyder (Maccabi "Ido Keren" Haifa)
 S. Ifrah (Beitar "iTrader" Jerusalem)
 S. Katzar (Beitar "iTrader" Jerusalem)
 A. Zvulun (Ilmazer "Yirmiyahu" Holon)
 M. Amar (Ilmazer "Yirmiyahu" Holon)

Winners

Awards

External links
 Kfar Qassem on Beach Soccer Worldwide
 3 Spain's beach soccer players were landed in Israel to join Maccabi "RE/MAX" Netanya
 Dieginio has returned to Israel to sign at Rosh HaAyin

Youtube highlights

 Round 1's highlights
 Round 2's highlights
 Round 3's highlights
 Round 4's highlights
 Round 5's highlights
 Quarter-finals + Relegation playoffs highlights
 The Final

See also
 Israeli Beach Soccer League

References

Israeli Beach Soccer League seasons
National beach soccer leagues
2016 in beach soccer